Silvana or Sylvana, meaning "one who lives in the forest" in Latin, is a female given name. Notable people with the name include: 

 Silvana Arbia (born 1952), Italian judge and prosecutor
 Silvana Arias (born 1982), Peruvian actress
 Silvana Armenulić (1938–1976), Yugoslav singer and songwriter
 Silvana De Mari (born 1953), Italian writer, psychotherapist, and doctor
 Silvana Franco (born 1968), British chef
 Silvana Gallardo (1953–2012), American actress
 Silvana Ibarra (born 1959), Ecuadorian singer, actress, and politician
 Silvana Imam (born 1986), Swedish rapper of Lithuanian origin
 Silvana Jachino (1916–2004), Italian actress
 Silvana Koch-Mehrin (born 1970), German politician
 Silvana Mangano (1930–1989), Italian actress
 Silvana Pampanini (born 1925), Italian actress
 Silvana Paternostro, Colombian journalist
 Silvana Santaella (born 1983), Venezuelan beauty pageant
 Silvana Sciarra (born 1948), Italian judge
 Silvana Suárez (born 1958), Argentinian beauty pageant
 Silvana Tenreyro, British-Argentine economist
 Silvana Tirinzoni (born 1979), Swiss curler
 Sylvana Foa (born 1945), American journalist and spokesperson
 Sylvana Gómez, Guatemalan beach volleyball player
 Sylvana Simons (born 1971), Dutch politician and former actress and TV presenter
 Sylvana Windsor, Countess of St Andrews (born 1957), Canadian historian

See also
 Silvana (disambiguation)
 Silvina, a given name
 Sylvania (disambiguation)

Feminine given names